is a Japanese former baseball player, coach, and manager for the Yakult Swallows in Nippon Professional Baseball. He batted left-handed, and threw right-handed. His number 1 is honoured by the Swallows.

Awards and accomplishments
MVP (1978)
2x Batting Title (1972,1977)
9x Best Nine Award (1972–1974, 1976–1980, 1984)
Golden Glove Award (1977, 1978)
Championship Series MVP (1978)
11x times All-Star selection(1972–1980, 1983, 1984)
2x All-Star games MVP (1973, 1977)

References

1947 births
Living people
Baseball people from Hokkaido
Japanese baseball players
Nippon Professional Baseball outfielders
Yakult Atoms players
Yakult Swallows players
Managers of baseball teams in Japan
Tokyo Yakult Swallows managers
Nippon Professional Baseball MVP Award winners
Japanese Baseball Hall of Fame inductees